Niskin is a surname. Notable people with the surname include:

Borghild Niskin (1924–2013), Norwegian alpine skier
Shale Niskin (1926–1988), American inventor